Erdmuta Zofia von Dieskau  (1698-1767), was a Polish aristocrat. She replaced Marianna Denhoff as the mistress of Augustus II the Strong in 1719 and was replaced by Henrietta von Osterhausen in 1720.

References

 Rudzki E., Polskie królowe, t. 2, wyd. 2, Instytut Prasy i Wydawnictw Novum, Warszawa 1990, ss. 265–266.

Mistresses of Augustus the Strong
Polish nobility
1698 births
1767 deaths